The Paris Masters is an annual tennis tournament for male professional players held in Paris, France. It is played indoors at the AccorHotels Arena, in the neighborhood of Bercy.
The event is part of the ATP Tour Masters 1000 on the Association of Tennis Professionals (ATP) Tour.

The tournament evolved from the French Covered Court Championships. In the open era it was held at the Stade Pierre de Coubertin until 1982. In 1989 it was upgraded to become one of the Grand Prix Tour (Grand Prix Super Series). The event is usually the final tournament on the tour before the season-ending ATP Finals. Because of its sponsorship, the event was officially known from 2003 to 2016 as BNP Paribas Masters, and from 2017 as the Rolex Paris Masters. Prior to the Tennis Masters Series replacing the ATP Super 9 in 2000, the event was known as the Paris Open. It is also often referred to as the Paris Indoor event in reference to both the facts that the other tennis event held in Paris, the French Open is held outdoors, and that since 2009, it is the only Masters 1000 tournament which is played indoors. From 1970 until 1986 there had usually been three indoor events amongst the top nine tournaments (then called the Grand Prix Championship Series), with there being four indoor events plus the year-end Championships from 1978 to 1980.  From 1987 until 2008 there were two indoor tournaments at the Masters level.

The surface used to be one of the fastest courts in the world which rewarded bold attacking tennis, but since 2011 it has followed the general slow-down of most courts on the tour. Paris Masters was played on carpet courts between 1990 and 1999 and 2001 until 2007.

Ilie Năstase, Andre Agassi, Roger Federer and Novak Djokovic are the only players ever to have won both Parisian tournaments (Bercy and the French Open). Djokovic won Bercy in 2009, 2013–15, 2019, 2021 and the French Open in 2016, 2021, Federer won the French Open in 2009 and Bercy in 2011 and Andre Agassi won Bercy in 1994 and both in 1999 as did Ilie Năstase in 1973. In 2015, Marcelo Melo and Ivan Dodig won the doubles events at both tournaments. To date, Novak Djokovic is the only player who has successfully defended his title in Paris (2013–15).

Past finals

Singles

Doubles

Records

Singles

Doubles

See also

 French Covered Court Championships – predecessor to Paris Masters
 Clarins Open

References

External links

 Official tournament website 
 ATP tournament profile

 
Rolex sponsorships